Vik is a village in the municipality of Flatanger in Trøndelag county, Norway. The village has a school, a shop, and Vik Church.

References

Villages in Trøndelag
Flatanger